Fat Tony may refer to:

Anthony Salerno, New York mobster also known as "Fat Tony"
Fat Tony (The Simpsons), a recurring gangster character in the animated sitcom The Simpsons
Fat Tony (rapper), American rapper from Houston, Texas
Fat Tony & Co., Australian television series
Tony Mokbel, Australian crime figure
Tony Romo, Dallas Cowboys quarterback known as "Fat Tony" based on training camp photos